Tutino is an Italian surname. Notable people with the surname include:

Gennaro Tutino (born 1996), Italian footballer
Kayla Tutino (born 1992), Canadian women's ice hockey player
Marco Tutino (born 1954), Italian classical composer

See also
Totino

Italian-language surnames